Tomás Lezana (born 16 February 1994) is an Argentine rugby union player who plays as a loose forward for US Montauban, and the Argentina national rugby union team.

Career

Lezana began his career, playing with the Santiago Lawn Tennis Club from 2013 before being signed by the Jaguares in 2016, who he played for until 2020. In December 2020 he was signed by the Western Force to play in the 2021 Super Rugby AU season and Super Rugby Trans-Tasman.

International career

Lezana was a member of the Argentina Under-20 side which competed in the 2013 and 2014 IRB Junior World Championships, he also represented the Argentina Jaguars team in 2014 in their matches against  and Canada A.

References

1994 births
Living people
Rugby union flankers
Argentine rugby union players
Argentina international rugby union players
Jaguares (Super Rugby) players
Pampas XV players
Western Force players
Scarlets players
People from Santiago del Estero
Sportspeople from Santiago del Estero Province
US Montauban players